Two Sides is a 2012 compilation album by English multi-instrumentalist Mike Oldfield.

Two Sides or two sides may also refer to:

"Two Sides" (After Forever song), a song by Dutch symphonic metal band After Forever from the 2004 album Invisible Circles released as a single in 2006
"Two Sides" (Living Colour song), a song by the American rock band Living Colour from the 2017 album Shade
Two Sides (TV series), a 2019 Snapchat romance drama
Two Sides Of, a 1985 album by Irish singer Daniel O'Donnell
Two Sides of "Crash", a 1973 album by American country singer Billy "Crash" Craddock

See also

Two-sided